The Austin Peay Governors women's basketball team represents Austin Peay State University (aka Peay) in Clarksville, Tennessee. The Governors currently compete in the Ohio Valley Conference, but will move to the ASUN Conference after the 2021–22 season.

The 2022–23 season will not only be Peay's first in the ASUN Conference, but also its last at its current on-campus home of Winfield Dunn Center. After that season, the Governors will move to the new F&M Bank Arena in downtown Clarksville. The new arena was originally intended to open for the 2022–23 season, but has been delayed to July 2023.

History
Historically, Peay's women's teams had been known as "Lady Govs", but the university began using "Governors" for women's teams in 2015–16.

As of the end of the 2015–16 season, the Governors have an all-time record of 459–669 since records were kept in 1976. They had played from 1929 to 1936 and had started play again in 1970, but those records are lost. The Govs have made the NCAA Tournament seven times, losing in the First Round each time.

NCAA tournament results
The Governors have made the NCAA Division I women's basketball tournament seven times. They have a combined record of 0-7.

Players

Retired numbers 
The Governors have retired two women's basketball numbers in their history.

References

External links